Cthulhu is a 2007 American horror film directed by Dan Gildark and co-written by Grant Cogswell and Daniel Gildark. The film is loosely based on the novella The Shadow over Innsmouth (1936) by H. P. Lovecraft.

The film moves the story from New England to the Pacific Northwest. The film is notable among works adapted from Lovecraft's work for having a gay protagonist. Screenwriter Grant Cogswell explained that he and Gildark chose to exploit the metaphor for the horror faced by a gay person returning for a relative's funeral and having to face the horrors of small-town life.

The film premiered June 14, 2007, at the Seattle International Film Festival and officially opened in select theatrical venues August 22, 2008.

Plot
When young history professor Russ is called upon by his sister to execute their late mother's estate, he is reunited with boyhood friend Mike, and with his father, the charismatic leader of a New Age cult. While exploring his memories, Russ wanders into a warehouse where hundreds of names are listed on the walls. As he sleeps that night, he dreams of a stone cudgel and awakens to find a cudgel (with the word Dagon written on it) in his motel room; the town drunk warns him that it is an instrument of sacrifice. A young liquor store clerk enlists him to help find her brother, whom she believes has been taken by the cult. Russ's aunt, who has been living in an asylum, tells him that his mother left a message hidden in her house.

Looking for answers in the warehouse, Russ is taken on an unbelievable journey through the small town's ancient, subterranean origins. When he escapes, he and Mike find the girl's brother murdered. Russ begins to believe preparations are underway for a mass sacrifice, and engages the attentions of a seductress in order to obtain information. He is raped and arrested for murder on the eve of the May Festival. The stakes are raised when Russ discovers that the cult intends to take over the world by raising anthropomorphic creatures from the sea.

Russ is shown his children in a bathtub. The film ends with Russ and his best friend/lover being held by the cult, as Russ' father orders him to sacrifice the man he loves. Russ moves to strike someone.

Cast
Cara Buono as Dannie
Jason Cottle as Russ
Richard Garfield as Zadok
Ian Geoghegan as Ralph
Scott Green as Mike
Dennis Kleinsmith as Reverend Marsh
Amy Minderhout as Julia
Robert Padilla as Ancestor
Tori Spelling as Susan
Nancy Stark as Aunt Josie
Hunter Stroud as Teen Russ
Rob Hamm as Jake

Critical reception
The film holds a 62% "Fresh" rating on Rotten Tomatoes. Maitland McDonagh wrote, "it's a thoughtful and sometimes very creepy film that tackles big themes on a small budget and proves that in the right hands, ideas can trump special effects." Steve Barton of Dread Central wrote, "Cthulhu is high on ambition and originality and the closest we've come to a true H. P. Lovecraft film." Conversely, Mark Olsen of the Los Angeles Times wrote, "Cthulhu isn't awful, but it isn't particularly compelling either," while John Anderson of Variety wrote, "the acting is so emotionally unhinged and erratic it borders on camp."

References

External links

 
 
 
Horror Asylum Release Date Article

2007 films
2007 horror films
American horror films
American LGBT-related films
Cthulhu Mythos films
2000s English-language films
Films based on works by H. P. Lovecraft
LGBT-related horror films
Films shot in Washington (state)
Films shot in Seattle
Works based on The Shadow over Innsmouth
Gay-related films
Films about cults
Folk horror films
American mystery horror films
2007 LGBT-related films
2000s American films